Bang Soo-hyun (Hangul: 방수현; Hanja: 方銖賢; born 13 September 1972) is a former badminton player from South Korea who was one of the world's leading women's singles players of the 1990s. She was a contemporary and rival of Indonesia's Susi Susanti and China's Ye Zhaoying and recorded wins over both in major badminton tournaments. Noted for a style that combined impressive power and movement, she retired from competition after her victory in the 1996 Atlanta Olympics, shortly before her 24th birthday. She was elected to the World Badminton Hall of Fame in 2019.

Career

Summer Olympics 
Barcelona 1992
Bang competed in badminton at the 1992 Summer Olympics in women's singles. She had a bye in the first round, defeated Catrine Bengtsson of Sweden in the second and Hisuko Mizui of Japan in the third. In quarterfinals Bang Soo-hyun edged Sarwendah Kusumawardhani of Indonesia 11–2, 3–11, 12–11 to advance to the semifinals. There, she beat the reigning world champion Tang Jiuhong of China 11–3, 11–2. In the final, she lost to Indonesia's Susi Susanti 11–5, 5–11, 3–11 to finish with the silver medal.

Atlanta 1996
Bang also competed in the 1996 Atlanta Olympics. She won the gold medal in women's singles without dropping a game in any match, defeating Susi Susanti in semifinals 11–9, 11–8, and Mia Audina in the final, 11–6, 11–7.

World Championships 
She won two medals in the IBF World Championships, in 1993 a silver medal as runner-up to Susanti, and in 1995 a bronze medal.

Other championships 
Bang won the quadrennial Asian Games in 1994, and the prestigious All England Open Badminton Championships over Ye Zhaoying in 1996, having been a runner-up in close matches in both 1992 and 1993. Her other titles included the Welsh (1989), Hong Kong (1992), South Korea (1993, 1994, 1996), Swedish (1993, 1994), and Canadian (1995) Opens.

Achievements

Olympic Games 
Women's singles

World Championships 
Women's singles

World Cup 
Women's singles

Asian Games 
Women's singles

Asian Championships 
Women's singles

Asian Cup 
Women's singles

IBF World Grand Prix 
The World Badminton Grand Prix sanctioned by International Badminton Federation (IBF) from 1983 to 2006.

Women's singles

Women's doubles

IBF International 
Women's singles

Record against selected opponents 
Record against year-end Finals finalists, World Championships semi-finalists, and Olympic quarter-finalists.

References

External links 
 
 
 

1972 births
Living people
Badminton players from Seoul
Onyang Bang clan
South Korean female badminton players
Badminton players at the 1992 Summer Olympics
Badminton players at the 1996 Summer Olympics
Olympic badminton players of South Korea
Olympic gold medalists for South Korea
Olympic silver medalists for South Korea
Olympic medalists in badminton
Medalists at the 1996 Summer Olympics
Medalists at the 1992 Summer Olympics
Badminton players at the 1994 Asian Games
Asian Games gold medalists for South Korea
Asian Games medalists in badminton
Medalists at the 1994 Asian Games
World No. 1 badminton players
20th-century South Korean women
21st-century South Korean women